Girvan ("mouth of the River Girvan") is a burgh and harbour town in Carrick, South Ayrshire, Scotland. Girvan is situated on the east coast of the Firth of Clyde, with a population of about 6,450.

Deriving its name from the river which runs through the landscape the etymology of Girvan has possible Brythonic origins, related to the Welsh: Gearafon or Gwyrddafon, "river flowing through the green flourishing place, from afon or avon, a river, and Gwyrdd, green, flourishing").

Prehistory and archaeology 
The earliest evidence of human habitation in the Girvan area dates to the Mesolithic.

Between 1996 and 1998, archaeological investigations were undertaken by GUARD archaeology (then part of the University of Glasgow) as part of an expansion of the William Grant & Sons distillery. This work discovered several burnt mounds that dated to the later third millennium/early second millennium BC and a Iron Age trackway. They also discovered a Medieval moated enclosure, which is a house or compound surrounded by a moat. These are usually the homes of minor aristocracy but are rare in Scotland (of the roughly 5400 known from mainland Britain, only ~120 are in Scotland). It is surmised that it might have belong to the Bruce family group, either a relative or a supporter and that it was likely that the house would have been known to Robert the Bruce, as he was born at Turnberry.

Two Roman camps lie half a mile (0.8 km) north of the estuary of the Water of Girvan in level fields of Girvan Mains Farm. The provision of a beach head at either site would have allowed the camps to fulfill the function of a base for Agricolan combined army and naval operations around the Scottish coast.

History
Girvan was originally a fishing port. In 1668, it became a municipal burgh incorporated by charter.

The opening of the railways, initially with the Maybole and Girvan Railway at the end of the 1850s, encouraged the development of Girvan as a seaside resort with beaches and cliffs. Holidaying here from 1855 to 1941 were Robert and Elizabeth Gray and their children; particularly Alice and Edith Gray. The family, led principally by Elizabeth and Alice, created scientifically organised collections of fossils for several museums including the Natural History Museum.

Just north of the town is Grangestone Industrial Estate, which hosts a William Grant & Sons distillery which opened in 1964. There is a Nestlé factory that manufactures chocolate that is shipped down to York and used in Kit Kat and Yorkie bars.

Transport
Girvan railway station is served by ScotRail on  the Glasgow Central to Stranraer line. All services call here, and several more start/terminate here.

Girvan is also served well by bus. Stagecoach West Scotland provide some of Girvan's bus services;

58/60: Ayr to Girvan

358/360: Ayr/Girvan to Stranraer

359: Girvan to Newton Stewart/Isle of Whithorn

Other bus services;

By Shuttle Buses;

362: Girvan to Colmonell

363: Colmonell to Kilwinning

By South Ayrshire Community Transport;

CB8: Girvan to Barr

Places of interest
Knockcushan Gardens contains the old 'Hill of Justice' stone and a plaque records that King Robert the Bruce, Earl of Carrick held a court here in 1328.

The McKechnie Institute was endowed by  local businessmen Robert and Thomas McKechnie, was opened in 1889.

The coastline south of Girvan is famous for its geology, and also for the Sawney Bean Caves at Bennane Head or Balcreuchan Port, where the murderer and cannibal Sawney Bean supposedly lived until his arrest and execution in Edinburgh.

Local festivals

Girvan RNLI harbour gala takes place each summer, usually in July, with music, stalls, fun fair, rescue displays and emergency services. Girvan Lifeboat station recently received their new Shannon Class all-weather lifeboat, powered by water jets making it the most manoeuvrable and capable all-weather boat in the fleet. 13-23 Elizabeth and Gertrude Allan is the 2nd Shannon Class lifeboat in Scotland and the 1st on the west coast.

The Girvan Traditional Folk Festival takes place on the first weekend of May each year. Girvan also has a folk music club.

The Lowland Gathering takes place on the first Sunday of June each year in the Victory Park in the centre of the town.

The annual Festival of Light takes place in October with a six-week lantern project resulting in the river of light lantern procession and shorefront performance. The autumn lantern project is a celebration of the lanternmakers and the people of Carrick.

Education and community

Girvan has its own secondary school, Girvan Academy, which the majority of local children attend. Roman Catholic families have the option of Queen Margaret Academy in Ayr. There are also two primary schools, Girvan Primary School (non-denominational) and Sacred Heart Primary School (denominational) and there is one non-denominational specialist school, Invergarven School.

The town's swimming pool was closed in 2009 by South Ayrshire Council, on the grounds that it had reached the end of its operational life. The building has since been demolished. A new leisure centre, named 'The Quay Zone' was officially opened on 26 April 2017. 'The Quay Zone' was built in a way to help redevelop Girvan. It is sited on the old swimming pool's location at the harbour.

Churches
Girvan has a Roman Catholic church, "Sacred Hearts of Jesus and Mary", built around 1863. The Church is in Harbour Lane, situated between Louisa Drive and Henrietta Street, close to the junction with Ailsa Street West.
For many years the convent and the church were closely connected with Roman Catholic primary and secondary schools in Girvan, whilst the secondary school closed a number of years ago [and the building converted to flats], the primary school has recently been demolished and rebuilt and continues to this day as a thriving primary school.

The entity known as "The Charles" also has its own place of worship within the town.

Milestone Christian Fellowship, a local congregation which began meeting in Girvan's Community Centre in 2005, moved into a redeveloped nightclub on Bridge Street in 2016. Milestone is a member of the Baptist Union of Scotland.

The town's Episcopalian congregation of St John was closed in 2014: they had been using the town's Methodist church building for services after their building became unusable in 2009.

Twin town
 Torcy, Seine-et-Marne, France - in honour of a Scottish knight named Sir Thomas Huston originally from Girvan, who fought the English as part of the Auld Alliance during the Hundred Years War. Rewarding him for his bravery during the capture of Meaux in 1439, the King of France granted him the fiefdom of Torcy.

Notable people
 Greig Young, footballer
 Peter McCloy, footballer

Climate
Girvan has an oceanic climate (Köppen: Cfb).

See also
Lendalfoot - a nearby village.
Girvan Community Hospital

References

External links
 About Girvan 

 
Towns in South Ayrshire
Carrick, Scotland
Seaside resorts in Scotland